Isak is a surname.  Notable people with the name include:

Abdi Isak (born 1966), Somalian marathon runner 
Alexander Isak (born 1999) Swedish footballer
Joesoef Isak (1928–2009), Indonesian publisher, translator and left-wing intellectual
Kim Isak (born 1985) German-American singer, actress and radio personality

See also
Isaac (name), given name and surname